This is a list of hospitals in New Mexico (U.S. state), grouped by city and sorted by hospital name.  With a population of a little over 2 million, there were 37 hospitals in New Mexico in 2019.  The largest number of hospitals are in Albuquerque.  Tribal areas are serviced by hospitals run by the Indian Health Service.

Acoma
Acoma-Canoncito-Laguna Hospital (United States Public Health Service, Indian Health Service), 6 staffed beds

Alamogordo

Gerald Champion Regional Medical Center, 98 staffed beds

Albuquerque

Lovelace Health System
The Heart Hospital of New Mexico at Lovelace Medical Center, 55 staffed beds (
Lovelace Medical Center, 293 staffed beds
Lovelace Rehabilitation Hospital 
Lovelace Westside Hospital (West Mesa Medical Center), 70 staffed beds (
Lovelace Women's Hospital, 162 staffed beds
New Mexico VA Health Care System
Raymond G. Murphy VA Medical Center, 310 authorized beds
Presbyterian Healthcare Services
Presbyterian Hospital, 716 staffed beds 
Presbyterian Kaseman Hospital, 85 staffed beds
University of New Mexico Hospitals 
UNM Carrie Tingley Hospital
UNM Children's Hospital
UNM Children's Psychiatric Center
UNM Hospital, 555 staffed beds
UNM Psychiatric Center

Artesia
Artesia General Hospital, 49 staffed beds

Carlsbad
Carlsbad Medical Center, 95 staffed beds

Clayton
Union County General Hospital

Clovis
Clovis Baptist Hospital (defunct)
Plains Regional Medical Center, 106 staffed beds

Crownpoint
Crownpoint Healthcare Facility (United States Public Health Service, Indian Health Service), 19 staffed beds

Deming
Mimbres Memorial Hospital

Española
 Presbyterian Española Hospital, 52 staffed beds

Farmington

San Juan Regional Medical Center, 198 staffed beds

Gallup
Gallup Indian Medical Center, 74 staffed beds
Rehoboth McKinley Christian Health Care Services, 28 staffed beds )

Grants
Cibola General Hospital

Hobbs
Lea Regional Medical Center, 92 staffed beds

Las Cruces
Advanced Care Hospital of Southern New Mexico
Memorial Medical Center, 199 staffed beds 
Mesilla Valley Hospital
Mountain View Regional Medical Center, 180 staffed beds
Rehabilitation Hospital of Southern New Mexico
UNM Cancer Center (Southern New Mexico Cancer Center)
Three Crosses Regional Hospital [www.threecrossesregional.com]

Las Vegas
Alta Vista Regional Hospital, 46 staffed beds
New Mexico Behavioral Health Institute at Las Vegas

Los Alamos
Los Alamos Medical Center, 48 staffed beds

Lovington
Nor-Lea General Hospital

Mescalero
 Mescalero Hospital (United States Public Health Service, Indian Health Service), 6 staffed beds

Portales
Roosevelt General Hospital, 20 staffed beds

Raton
Miners' Colfax Medical Center

Rio Rancho
 Presbyterian Medical Center-Rio Rancho
 RUST (Presbyterian) Hospital, 0 staffed beds 
 UNM Sandoval Regional Medical Center, 60 staffed beds

Roswell
Eastern New Mexico Medical Center, 162 staffed beds 
Lovelace Regional Hospital, Roswell, 27 staffed beds 
New Mexico Rehabilitation Center

Ruidoso
Lincoln County Medical Center

Santa Fe
CHRISTUS St. Vincent Physicians Medical Center, 12 staffed beds
CHRISTUS St. Vincent Regional Medical Center, 214 staffed beds
Santa Fe Indian Hospital (United States Public Health Service, Indian Health Service), 4 staffed beds
Presbyterian Santa Fe Medical Center, 36 staffed beds

Santa Rosa
Guadalupe County Hospital, 10 staffed beds

Santa Teresa
Peak Behavioral Health Services

Shiprock
Northern Navajo Medical Center, 60 staffed beds

Silver City
Gila Regional Medical Center, 42 staffed beds

Socorro
Socorro General Hospital

Taos
Holy Cross Hospital

Truth or Consequences
Sierra Vista Hospital

Tucumcari
Dr. Dan C. Trigg Memorial Hospital

Zuni
Zuni Hospital  (United States Public Health Service, Indian Health Service), 27 staffed beds

Indian Health Service facilities
The Albuquerque Area of the Indian Health Service contains the following medical centers:
Acoma-Canoncito-Laguna Service Unit (with hospital) (Acoma, New Mexico)
Albuquerque Indian Health Center (with hospital)
Albuquerque Indian Dental Clinic
Jicarilla Service Unit (Dulce, New Mexico)
Mescalero Service Unit (with hospital in Mescalero, New Mexico) 
New Sunrise Regional Treatment Center
Santa Ana Health Center (Bernalillo, New Mexico)
Santa Fe Service Unit (with hospital in Santa Fe, New Mexico)
Taos-Picuris Service Unit (Taos, New Mexico)
Ute Mountain Ute Service Unit (Towaoc, Colorado)
Zia Health Clinic (Zia Pueblo, New Mexico)
Zuni Comprehensive Health Center (with hospital) (Zuni, New Mexico)

The Navajo Area of the Indian Health Service is partially within New Mexico.  It contains the following medical centers:
Chinle Comprehensive Health Care Facility (Chinle, Arizona)
Crownpoint Health Care Facility (Crownpoint, New Mexico)
Dzilth-Na-O-Dith-Hle Health Center (Bloomfield, New Mexico)
Fort Defiance Indian Hospital  
Four Corners Regional Health Center (Teec Nos Pos, Arizona)
Gallup Indian Medical Center (Gallup, New Mexico)
Inscription House Health Center (Shonto, Arizona)
Kayenta Health Center (Kayenta, Arizona)
Pinon Health Center (Pinon, Arizona)
Shiprock-Northern Navajo Medical Centerb(Shiprock, New Mexico)
Tohatchi Health Care Center (Southeastern portion of the Navajo Nation)
Tsaile Health Center (Tsaile, Arizona)
Tuba City Regional Health Care Corporation (Tuba City, Arizona)   
Winslow Indian Health Care Center (Winslow, Arizona)

References

New Mexico
 
Hospitals